Sarah Jones may refer to:

Sarah Jones (artist) (born 1959), London-based artist
Sarah Jones (field hockey) (born 1990), Welsh hockey player
Sarah Jones (freestyle wrestler) (born 1983), Scottish athlete
Sarah Jones (politician) (born 1972), British Member of Parliament
Sarah Jones (screen actress) (born 1983), American screen actress from Ugly Betty, Big Love and Alcatraz
Sarah Jones (stage actress) (born 1974), American stage actress, activist and poet
Sarah Jones (rower) (born 1973), American rower
Sarah Garland Boyd Jones (1866–1905), African-American physician
Sarah Jones (drummer) (born 1985), drummer for Harry Styles, NYPC and Hot Chip
Sarah Jones (author), British author and speaker
Sarah Rees Jones (born 1957), British historian
Sarah Jones (journalist) (born 1982), Australian television presenter and sportscaster
Sarah Patricia Jones (born 1934), full name of British salsa dancer Paddy Jones
Sarah Jones (1986–2014), camera assistant killed on the set of the unfinished film Midnight Rider inspiring the Safety for Sarah movement
Sarah L. Jones, pseudonym of the English author Catherine Cooper Hopley (1817–1911)
Sarah Jones, professional cheerleader, most notable for bringing a defamation suit; Jones v. Dirty World Entertainment Recordings LLC
Sarah Jones, reality contestant from Survivor: Marquesas
Sarah Jones, character in Fireman Sam